Khenmet was an ancient Egyptian king's daughter of the Twelfth Dynasty, around 1800 BC. She is mainly known from her unrobbed tomb containing a set of outstanding personal adornments.

Khenmet is only known from her burial next to the pyramid of Amenemhat II at Dahshur. On the West side of the pyramid were three underground galleries with each of two tombs. Four of these tombs, including those of Khenmet as well as Ita and Itaweret were found unlooted. 

Khenmet was buried in a set of three containers. There was an outer, undecorated sarcophagus, next, a wooden coffin, decorated on the outside with gold foil and on the inside with hieroglyphic texts. Finally there was an inner anthropoid coffin, that was found only badly preserved. The body of Khenmet was adorned with an array of jewellery including a broad collar, armlets, and anklets. Next to the body were found many weapons, typical for royal burials of the Middle Kingdom.

In the small chamber next to the sarcophagus were found further personal adornments. These included two crowns and parts of a necklace made in gold. The latter is most likely not an Egyptian work of art, but was perhaps produced in Crete. 

The father of Khenmet is uncertain. From the position of the burial, next to the pyramid of Amenemhat II it seems likely that she was his daughter. Some researchers point out that the burial equipment is more typical for the late Twelfth Dynasty. The same is true for the pottery found in the burials.

References 

Princesses of the Twelfth Dynasty of Egypt
19th-century BC women